The moral high ground, in ethical or political parlance, refers to the status of being respected for remaining moral, and adhering to and upholding a universally recognized standard of justice or goodness. In derogatory context, the term is often used to metaphorically describe a position of self-righteousness.
"Parties seeking the moral high ground simply refuse to act in ways which are not viewed as legitimate and morally defensible."

Politics
Holding the moral high ground can be used to legitimize political movements, notably nonviolent resistance, especially in the face of violent opposition, and has been used by civil disobedience movements around the world to garner sympathy and support from society.

Similarly, 21st century states may refrain from declaring war in order to retain the moral high ground – though the cynic will observe that realpolitik still leads to wars being fought, only without declarations.

Business
Economist and social critic Robert H. Frank challenged the idea that prosocial behavior was necessarily deleterious in business in his book What Price the Moral High Ground?

He argued that socially responsible firms often reap unexpected benefits even in highly competitive environments, because their commitment to principle makes them more attractive as partners to do business with.

Everyday use

In everyday use a person may take the perspective of the 'moral high ground' in order to produce a critique of something, or merely to win an argument. This perspective is sometimes associated to snobbery but may also be a legitimate way of taking up a stance.

Social sciences or philosophies are sometimes accused of taking the 'moral high ground' because they are often inherently interested in the project of human freedom and justice. The traditional project of education itself may be seen as defending a type of moral high ground from popular culture, perhaps by using critical pedagogy: its proponents may themselves be accused (rightly or wrongly) of seeking a false and unjustified sense of superiority thereby.

History
Robert Lowell took the moral high ground, not once, but twice, with separate American presidents, in protesting US militarism.

Peter Mandelson considered that Tony Blair was "good at taking the high ground and throwing himself off it".

See also
 Critical pedagogy
 Moral hierarchy
 Virtue signalling

References 

High ground
Political science